This class of small shunters has 150 members. They were delivered by Arbel Fauvet Rail in the early 1990s and seem to have been spread across France. They have the 0-4-0 ("B") wheel arrangement, 200 kW diesel engines and hydraulic transmission.

References

External links

Fleet list (SNCF): 

Diesel locomotives of France
B locomotives
Y08400
Arbel Fauvet Rail locomotives
Railway locomotives introduced in 1990
Standard gauge locomotives of France
Diesel-hydraulic locomotives

Shunting locomotives